Yehoshua Dovid Povarsky (1902–1999) was Rosh Yeshiva (dean) of Ponevezh Yeshiva.

Biography 
Povarsky studied in the Kelm Talmud Torah under Yeruchom Levovitz whom he followed when Levovitz went to work at Mir Yeshiva, where Povarsky was Yechiel Michel Feinstein's roommate.

He married Tzipporah Kreiser,  after which he studied under Elchonon Wasserman in Kovno.

Several of his sons became rabbis, including Baruch Dov Povarsky, his successor as rosh yeshiva.

Works 
Yeshuas Dovid (7 volumes)
Shiurei Reb Dovid Pavarsky on various Tractates
Yishmeru Da'as consisting of various Mussar discourses which he delivered

References 

1902 births
1999 deaths
Ponevezh Rosh yeshivas
People from Bnei Brak
Haredi rabbis in Israel
Haredi rabbis in Mandatory Palestine
Rabbis in Bnei Brak
Mir Yeshiva alumni